Porina is a genus of lichens in the family Trichotheliaceae. A 2020 estimate places about 145 species in the widespread genus.

Species

Porina abrupta 
Porina adflata 
Porina africana 
Porina ahlesiana 
Porina alba 
Porina albicera 
Porina albida 
Porina aluniticola 
Porina aptrootii 
Porina arnoldii 
Porina athertonii 
Porina atlantica 
Porina atriceps 
Porina atropunctata 
Porina australiensis 
Porina australis 
Porina austroatlantica 
Porina austropacifica 
Porina bacillifera 
Porina barbifera 
Porina bellendenica 
Porina biroi 
Porina blechnicola 
Porina boliviana 
Porina bonplandii 
Porina bryophila 
Porina canthicarpa 
Porina chloroticula 
Porina chrysophora 
Porina coarctata 
Porina conica 
Porina constrictospora  – Australia
Porina coralloidea 
Porina corrugata 
Porina crassa 
Porina cubana  – Cuba
Porina cupreola 
Porina danbullensis  – Australia
Porina decrescens  – Australia
Porina deminuta  – Raratonga
Porina distans 
Porina duduana 
Porina dwesica 
Porina effilata  – Macaronesia
Porina elixiana  – Australia
Porina eminentior 
Porina epiphylla 
Porina epiphylloides 
Porina exacta 
Porina exocha 
Porina farinosa 
Porina filispora 
Porina flavoaurantiaca  – Australia
Porina flavonigra 
Porina flavopapillata 
Porina florensii 
Porina fluminea 
Porina fortunata 
Porina fulvella 
Porina fulvelloides] 
Porina fulvula 
Porina gryseelsiana 
Porina guianensis 
Porina haehndelii 
Porina heterocarpa 
Porina heterospora 
Porina hibernica 
Porina hirsuta 
Porina howeana 
Porina huainamdungensis 
Porina hyperleptalea  – Australia
Porina impolita 
Porina insueta 
Porina internigrans 
Porina isidioambigua 
Porina kantvilasii 
Porina kennedyensis 
Porina lectissima 
Porina leptosperma 
Porina limbulata 
Porina limitata 
Porina linearispora  – Brazil
Porina longispora 
Porina lucida 
Porina malmei 
Porina mariae 
Porina mastoidella 
Porina maxispora  – Brazil
Porina meridionalis 
Porina microtriseptata 
Porina minutissima 
Porina mirabilis 
Porina monilisidiata 
Porina morelii 
Porina multipuncta 
Porina nadkarniae 
Porina nigrofusca 
Porina novemseptatoides  – Brazil
Porina nucula 
Porina nuculastrum 
Porina ocellatoides 
Porina ochraceocarpa 
Porina ocoteae  – Macaronesia
Porina pacifica 
Porina pallescens 
Porina papuensis 
Porina pelochroa 
Porina peregrina 
Porina perminuta 
Porina pilifera   – Costa Rica
Porina provincialis 
Porina pseudoapplanata 
Porina pseudomalmei 
Porina purpurata 
Porina radiata 
Porina rhaphidiophora 
Porina rhaphispora 
Porina rhodostoma 
Porina riparia 
Porina rivalis 
Porina rosei  – Europe
Porina rudiuscula 
Porina rufula 
Porina semecarpi 
Porina similis 
Porina simulans 
Porina sorediata 
Porina sphaerocephala 
Porina subapplanata 
Porina subargillacea 
Porina subnitidula 
Porina subnucula 
Porina sudetica 
Porina sylvatica  – Australia
Porina tahitiensis 
Porina tasmanica 
Porina termitophila  – Brazil
Porina terrae-reginae 
Porina tetracerae 
Porina thujopsidicola 
Porina tolgensis 
Porina tomentosa 
Porina tosaensis 
Porina trichothelioides 
Porina triseptata 
Porina ulceratula 
Porina ulleungdoensis 
Porina vanuatuensis  – Vanuatu
Porina virescens] 
Porina viridipustulata 
Porina weghiana 
Porina yambaruensis 
Porina yoshimurae

References

Cited literature

Gyalectales
Lichen genera
Taxa named by Johannes Müller Argoviensis
Gyalectales genera
Taxa described in 1883